Roland Dimon "Doc" Crandall (August 29, 1892 - August 14, 1972) was an American animator. He is best known for his work at Fleischer Studio, especially on the Betty Boop version of Snow White and as lead animator with Seymour Kneitel on the first year of the "Popeye" the Sailor cartoons starting in 1933.

Crandall was born in New Canaan, Connecticut, and attended the Yale School of Art. He was one of the first employees of Fleischer Studio, working on the early Koko the Clown shorts in the 1920s. Crandall's drawing ability was legendary; he animated virtually the entirety of the 1933 Betty Boop cartoon, Snow White himself. The film has been deemed "culturally significant" by the United States Library of Congress and selected for preservation in the National Film Registry. In 1994 it was voted #19 of the 50 Greatest Cartoons of all time by members of the animation field. The film is now Public Domain.

Crandall retired from animation in 1941 when Paramount Studios acquired Fleischer Studios. He moved to Bridgeport, Connecticut, where he worked as a commercial illustrator.
Crandall died on August 14, 1972, in Greenwich, Connecticut, 15 days before his 80th birthday.

Notes

External links
 

1892 births
1972 deaths
People from New Canaan, Connecticut
Animators from Connecticut
Fleischer Studios people